Iridescence (stylized in all lowercase) is the fourth studio album by American boy band Brockhampton, released on September 21, 2018 by Question Everything, Inc. and RCA Records. It is their major-label debut and the first installment of their The Best Years of Our Lives trilogy. The self-produced album was recorded at Abbey Road Studios in London, as well as the group's own studio in Hawaii. It is their first album since founding member Ameer Vann's departure from the group following sexual misconduct allegations. It debuted at number one on the US Billboard 200 albums chart, becoming the group's only chart-topping album.

Background
On December 14, 2017, Brockhampton announced their fourth studio album, Team Effort, slated for release in 2018, but in March 2018, they announced that Team Effort had been delayed. On March 20, Kevin Abstract and other members posted a "work-in-progress" album cover of "PUPPY", scrapping the name "Team Effort" completely. "PUPPY" was set to be released some time in June. The next week, they announced via social media that they had signed a record deal with Sony's RCA Records in a deal reportedly worth $15 million for six albums over three years. PUPPY was also delayed (revealed on Kevin Abstract's Instagram Live) following allegations of sexual misconduct against founding member Ameer Vann. On May 27, Brockhampton announced via Twitter that Vann would no longer be a part of the group, and cancelled the remainder of their tour dates to regroup.

Following Vann's departure, on June 20, the band made their late-night television debut when they appeared on The Tonight Show Starring Jimmy Fallon performing a new song "Tonya", accompanied by guest vocalists Jazmine Sullivan, Ryan Beatty and Serpentwithfeet, as well as revealing the new title of their upcoming album, The Best Years of Our Lives. The next month the group announced a Beats 1 radio show Things We Lost in the Fire Radio, where they debuted a trilogy of singles, "1999 Wildfire", "1998 Truman" and "1997 Diana", released throughout July 2018.

The album was recorded over 10 days at Abbey Road Studios in 2018, with further recording taking place at the Brockhampton Factory in Hawaii. Kevin Abstract stated on Twitter that the album was inspired by English rock band Radiohead's fourth studio album, Kid A (2000).

Release and promotion
On August 26, Kevin Abstract made a post on Instagram announcing the album's title and that it would come to be released in September, and later announced dates for their new "i'll be there" tour. On September 10, they released new "iridescence" merchandise on their website. The next day, they announced a documentary titled The Longest Summer In America set to be released in selected theaters on September 20.

The group then released the track listing and artwork for the album. A video for "J'ouvert" was released the day before the album's release and features shots of the members and other environments filmed on a thermal camera. The videos for "San Marcos" and "New Orleans" were released on the September 25 and 27, respectively. They were filmed during a tour of Australia, with "San Marcos" shot outside of a Hungry Jack's in Melbourne and "New Orleans" shot inside an Event Cinemas complex in Sydney.

The North American/Australian tour, "i'll be there" featuring 37 shows was going on from iridescence's release date up until December. On October 23, the band returned to Jimmy Fallon performing "District".

Critical reception

Iridescence received critical acclaim. At Metacritic, which assigns a normalized rating out of 100 to reviews from mainstream publications, Iridescence received an average score of 85, based on 11 reviews, indicating "universal acclaim". DIY gave the album a perfect score, with critic Will Richards writing, "Brockhampton have found a new sense of unity, and when Iridescence confronts every single one of these bumps, it proves that the band possess a truly special voice." Wren Graves of Consequence of Sound wrote, "Iridescence is full-to-bursting; it's like almost eating too much food, almost drinking too much booze; it's getting close to too much, and still asking for more."

Sputnikmusic opined that "Iridescence is the best Brockhampton album because it doesn't give a fuck what you think a Brockhampton album should sound like." NMEs El Hunt wrote, "Far from making vague allusions to the events prior to Iridescence, Brockhampton lay them bare, atop some of their most adventurous work to date." The Line of Best Fit critic Sam Higgins stated that "the more you listen, the more intricacies you notice. The more you listen, the more you realise just how defining this record will be for the future of Brockhampton." In his review for AllMusic, Neil Z. Yeung stated, "Brockhampton absorbs what they need from across genres, sharing honest confessions from their varied personal backgrounds (the most striking provided by group leader Kevin Abstract) and reflecting its mixed audience as a voice of their generation. Brockhampton have seized upon this defining moment with Iridescence, a defining peak in their young career."

Commercial performance
Iridescence debuted at number one on the US Billboard 200 dated October 6, 2018, with 101,000 album-equivalent units (including 79,000 pure album sales). It is the group's first number-one album. It fell to No. 88 in the next week's Billboard 200 chart and was not in the Billboard 200 chart dating to October 20, 2018.

Track listing
Credits adapted from Brockhampton's official website.

Notes
 All track titles stylized in all caps.
 "New Orleans" features vocals by Jaden Smith.
 "Thug Life" and "San Marcos" feature vocals by London Community Gospel Choir Children featuring St. Ann's.
 "Tonya" features vocals by Serpentwithfeet.
 "Honey" features additional vocals by Kirsty Hopkins.

Samples
 "Loophole" features a clip from Shade 45 featuring DJ Whoo Kid and Cam'ron.
 "Tape" contains an interpolation of "Videotape" by Radiohead.
  "J'ouvert" contains excerpts from "Doh Blame Me", performed by Lavaman and written by James Charles and Marcus James.
  "Honey" contains a sample of "Dance For You" by Beyoncé; and excerpts from "Bump", by Brockhampton

Personnel
Credits adapted from Brockhampton's official website.

Technical
 Russell "Joba" Boring – mixing 
 Matt Mysko – mixing , mixing assistance, recording assistance
 Andy Maxwell – mixing , mixing assistance, recording
 Neal H Pogue – mixing 
 Romil Hemnani – mixing assistance, recording
 Chris Parker – recording assistance
 Mike Bozzi – mastering

Artwork
 Henock Sileshi – creative direction, album cover direction
 Kevin Abstract – creative direction, album cover direction
 Ashlan Grey – photography, album cover direction
 George Muncey – album cover direction

Strings 
 Nicole Garcia – arrangement
 Laura Anstee
 Nick Barr
 Meghan Cassidy
 Rosie Danvers
 Patrick Kiernan
 Steve Morris
 Jenny Sacha
 Ellie Stamford

Charts

Weekly charts

Year-end charts

References

External links
 

2018 albums
Brockhampton (band) albums